Abdoh Ibrahim Otaif (born April 2, 1984, in Saudi Arabia) is a former football player who played for Al-Shabab in Riyadh and Saudi Arabia national team. In 2010 he was called up for the 2010 World Cup qualifiers against Singapore and Uzbekistan.

His beginning with Al-Shabab
Otaif began his career with Al-Shabab during the 2003–2004 season. He was 20 years old at that time, but was able to win the Saudi Premier League with his club that year, even though him and many other Al-Shabab players were very young.

International goals
Scores and results list Saudi Arabia's goal tally first.

Brothers
Otaif is only one of the many Otaif family players in Al-Shabab. Also he has a brother, Ahmed Otaif, who is one year younger than him, and Ali Otaif, both with Abdoh in Al-Shabab's first team. There is also Saqr and Abdullah Otaif, both are in the U-19 Al-Shabab and U-16 Al-Shabab team. All five siblings have gone through the youth teams of Saudi Arabia.

Honours
Club and national team
 Saudi Premier League: 2004, 2006
 Saudi Champions Cup: 2008, 2009
 Saudi Federation cup: 2009, 2010

Runner-up
 AFC Asian Cup: 2007
 Saudi Premier League: 2005
 Crown Prince Cup: 2009

Winner
Al-Nassr
2013–14 Saudi Crown Prince Cup
 Saudi Professional League 2013–14

References

External links

 

Living people
1984 births
Saudi Arabian footballers
Saudi Arabia international footballers
Association football midfielders
Al-Shabab FC (Riyadh) players
2007 AFC Asian Cup players
2011 AFC Asian Cup players
Al Nassr FC players
Ittihad FC players
Al-Anwar Club players
Saudi Professional League players
Saudi Fourth Division players